Lodge Road, West Bromwich Town Hall tram stop is a tram stop at the western edge of West Bromwich town centre in the West Midlands, England. It was opened on 31 May 1999 and is situated on Midland Metro Line 1.

The stop is located in a deep cutting, and a lift has been installed to take passengers to and from street level, as well as a spiral walkway.

In 2015/16 it was the least used stop on Line 1.

Services
Mondays to Fridays, Midland Metro services in each direction between Birmingham and Wolverhampton run at six to eight-minute intervals during the day, and at fifteen-minute intervals during the evenings and on Sundays. They run at eight minute intervals on Saturdays.

References

 Article on this Metro stop from Rail Around Birmingham & the West Midlands
 This stop's entry at thetrams.co.uk

West Midlands Metro stops
Transport in Sandwell
West Bromwich
Railway stations in Great Britain opened in 1999